Household is an American melodic punk and "indie-coated emo" band from Minneapolis, Minnesota, formed in August 2013. The band's members are Joshua Gilbert (vocals, bass), Matthew Anthony (drums), and Nathanael Olson (guitar).

On December 6, 2017, Household signed to Equal Vision Records. They released their second album, Everything A River Should Be on February 23, 2018 through Equal Vision.

Household was previously signed to Blood & Ink Records, releasing their first EP, With and Without on September 30, 2014, and their debut full-length album, Time Spent on September 25, 2015, both of which were received well by reviewers. Household also released a split EP with Infinite Me on May 5, 2017.

AltPress cited Household as one of the 18 bands to watch in 2018, describing their sound as "charismatic yet somber, emo yet uplifting." PureVolume called Household "one of the best new bands to come from the Twin Cities."

History

Signing with Blood and Ink 

Household signed with Blood & Ink Records on June 5, 2014. In a statement announcing the record deal, Blood & Ink wrote of Household: "Just barely out of high school, these five have already learned what it means to work hard and make a name for themselves in the Minneapolis scene. With no concern for the status quo, their take on punk/hardcore is passionate, intense and simply refreshing", and characterized their sound as a "raw yet mature blend of modern, melodic hardcore."

With or Without EP release (September 30, 2014) 

Along with the announcement of signing to Blood & Ink, Household also released a music video for "Reservoir", the first single from their forthcoming debut EP, With or Without. Shortly after, Household premiered another single from With or Without, "Purpose", on August 26, 2014, via Under the Gun Review. Under the Gun Review speculated that Household's EP would appeal to fans of "everything from La Dispute and Aviator to Shai Hulud."

On September 30, 2014, Household issued their first EP, With or Without, via Blood & Ink Records. Their debut was met with excitement in the local Minneapolis scene, and soon after started earning the band national attention, supported by an ambitious touring schedule.

With or Without rooted the band's sound in melodic hardcore and punk, and drew comparisons to Killing The Dream, Shai Hulud, Sinking Ships, and The Chariot. New Noise Magazine characterized Household and their sound at the time of With or Without as "unapologetic and bursting with energy." Indie Vision described the release as "a mash-up of melodic hardcore, chaos, and post-hardcore" that finds its place "in the large revival of 90s style raw hardcore/metalcore, a artistic [sic] look back at a time when passion and honesty played a foundational role in a band's identity."

Other reviewers pointed to the raw and, at times, imperfect recordings as a factor in bolstering the band's energetic sound, as well as strengthening the themes of honesty and vulnerability that Household explored on the EP. Tuned Up and Indie Vision Music wrote that the band "seems to have complete control over their sound", and Indie Vision Music stated that the "rawness" and "bareness" of the album places them firmly in the category of "bands that are willing to be real with their words and their music and not allow their art to become synthesized and processed until it is indiscernible from 90 percent of their peers."

Household was also praised for original and creative songwriting on With or Without with vulnerable lyrics that were upfront about the band's convictions. About the message of the album, Gilbert says, "With or Without was very much, 'This is what we believe and why.

In a later interview with New Noise Magazine about the band's recording process, Gilbert said that they "wrote the EP in a basement when we had never played shows and we were just kids trying to write metal."

"Purpose" music video and leaving the 828 House 

Several months after With or Without's release, Household released a music video for "Purpose" on January 8, 2015. The video was directed by Dan Ostrem, and features shots from their final show at the 828 House, the house where the band was formed. Household was in the process of relocating to Kansas City to focus on touring.

About the video, Gilbert commented: "This house was the foundation of the band's start. Everything we've done and everyone we know is connected to that home. We had to make this [video] in honor of our great experience."

A longer video shows footage from the band's final show at the 828 House on August 27, 2014. During the video, friends give a farewell to Household, and during their set, Gilbert says:

"For me, the biggest reason I feel led to do what we're doing is because what we found here is so amazing, and so beautiful ... that I can't just stay here and be comfortable ... because I feel so strongly that there are other places that need this."

Vocal transition and recording Time Spent 

Months before they were set to record their new album, Gilbert developed vocal polyps. Prevented from screaming in the style that defined With or Without, which the band had been developing since its conception about 18 months earlier, Gilbert adopted a more melodic singing style. This new singing style was "easier and healthier for me to perform", Gilbert said.

Between songs during Household's set at the Columbus show on tour with Church Tongue in 2016, Gilbert said that Columbus was one of first shows where Household was forced to change styles due to his vocal health before the release of Time Spent.

With a changing style, Household decided to stick to the original schedule of the album, announcing on Facebook on March 24 that they were entering the studio with producer and Defeater guitarist, Jay Maas, to begin recording their debut LP, Time Spent.

Gilbert told New Noise Magazine that the new vocal style was developed from two primary sources. The first was with Melissa Cross, a vocal instructor in New York who helped Gilbert work through his vocal polyps and avoid surgery. The second was Maas, who helped Household fine-tune their new sound alongside Gilbert's vocal change during the recording process. Gilbert said:

"[Jay] made things go smoothly despite all the changes, and he really knew where to direct things even when we didn't. ... I'm really happy with how the vocal transition sounds on the record, and I think a lot of that has to do with Jay. I know it ended up being different and weird compared to what a lot of other bands are doing, but I was really happy with how [the vocals] ended up, and how Jay was able to mesh the vocals without adding a lot of compression or layering. It comes off very raw, which was important for the transition."

"It was hard, and I wouldn't say I've totally figured out the new way," Gilbert told New Noise Magazine on November 9, 2015, shortly after the album's release.

In April 2017, Gilbert and Household bassist Josh Czech told Tuned Up podcast that recording with Maas took two weeks and was the band's first professional recording experience.

Time Spent album release (March 24, 2015) 

The singles "Wistern", released July 20, 2015, "Undertow" released August 11, 2015", and "Try Hard" released September 2, 2015, were the first tastes of Household's new sound on Time Spent. At the premiere of "Undertow", Alt Press wrote that the single and the Time Spent formula is "one of unpredictability that blends several genres and styles with a cohesive sleekness," saying that "[r]aw hardcore elements meet emo and pop-punk with a little bit of math rock thrown in for good measure."

Household released their debut album, Time Spent, on September 25, 2015, via Blood & Ink Records.

Time Spent is considered by many as Household's break out release, spanning an impressive range of styles and bearing witness to many layers of influence, "def[ing] heavy music's current status quo by succinctly covering a vast array of ground."

The album was received well by critics and earned many positive reviews. PureVolume called Household "one of the best new bands to come from the Twin Cities" on the day of Time Spents release, saying their "bonecrushing guitar riffs and pulsating drumming offer a terrific blend of hardcore and melodic punk." Alt Press cited Household as one of 16 bands to watch in 2016. Substream Magazine calls Time Spent a "huge leap forward for the band, with heartfelt lyrics atop winding melodies and clever arrangements." Circuit Sweet said the sound of Time Spent demonstrates Household's "impressive growth as a band."

Reviewers pointed out that Time Spent marks a change in direction from melodic hardcore on With or Without to a new space of melodic punk and emo. Alongside Gilbert's vocal shift to a more "melodic singing style", Household adapted instrumentally by "incorporating more tuneful elements into their aggressive sound" while still drawing from the band's roots in "progressive punk and hardcore aggression."

The result is a confluence of hardcore, post-hardcore, melodic punk, and emo. The Antidote Radio called Household's influence on Time Spent "varied and deep" with Gilbert's "powerful singing voice holding it all together." Alt Press pointed to a sound that weaves together "robust, hardcore-induced riffage to quaint, raw melodies" which "impresses in unexpected-yet-inviting ways."

This blend of style makes Time Spent an "incredibly brave and confident full-length that jumps around between sounds and scenes with wild abandon yet feels cohesive throughout," not simply shallowly touching on numerous genres, but successfully cultivating each style in such a way that Sean Gonzales described as the "amalgamation of the last ten years of hardcore music and its subgenres," saying that it "fuses about every element of hardcore into 13 songs."

Gilbert commented on the band's new sound at the premiere of the "Wistern" single, saying: "Time Spent is a whole new sound for us. We've changed in a lot of new ways and ‘Wistern' is the foundation of that. It sets up not only our new musical approach, but it also prefaces the album's theme of searching and asking questions. The song opens up the idea that we're all just people trying to understand life and the difficulties that it can bring."

Substream Magazine compares Household to bands Such Gold and Story So Far. Alt Press compares Household's sound on Time Spent to a blend of Being As An Ocean and the Story So Far. Lambgoat called their sound a "passionate blend of progressive punk with hardcore aggression, filling the sonic gaps between bands like Touché Amore, Turnstile, and Such Gold."

The day Time Spent was released, Household released a music video for "Sway."

 Split EP with Infinite Me (May 5, 2017) 

On March 14, 2017, Household premiered "Distant Truth (Part 1)", a track from the forthcoming split with then Blood & Ink labelmates Infinite Me.

With the track, Gilbert issued the following statement: "The first track is the beginning of our tonal transition between Time Spent and our next record. I'm excited about tracks like this one, because it widens our genre range and will hopefully allow us to explore all sorts of areas musically."

On May 5, Household and Infinite Me released a split EP. The split is mixed by Matty McClellan of Glow In The Dark Studios and mastered by Bill Henderson at Azimuth Mastering.

Their label at the time, Blood & Ink Records, billed the split as the band "stepping away from their melodic-punk roots and into the burgeoning realm of indie-coated emo."

In an interview with Tuned Up podcast, vocalist Joshua Gilbert and then bassist Josh Czech said that, on the split, Household continued to modify their sound, asking listeners to follow them again to another new sound, saying that "jump from Within and Without to Time Spent was a big jump, and the jump from Time Spent to the split is an even bigger jump."

Gilbert said the new sound was in part influenced by his vocal condition, saying the sound that the band found on the split is the "last chapter in transition from something he shouldn't be doing to vocals he can sustain" in a healthy way.

Some reviewers commented on Household's continual changing of sound, this time heading in the direction of emo. New Noise Magazine praised Household's side of the split, describing their three songs as "driving and punchy, saying that "their throwback emo/post-hardcore is as emotionally heavy as it musically engaging," commending the raw vocals. Mind Equals Blown commented that, though Household anchored their "beginnings in punk, ... they've since hinged more on melody," saying that "[w]hile elements of hardcore and punk both remain in their new identity, they now also share elements with a range of Tooth & Nail Record artists" like August Burns Red and Emery, and incorporate "combinations of indie rock, post-hardcore, emo, and punk." 
Household's sound on the split was compared to As Cities Burn, Emery, and My Epic. Mind Equals Blown went on to say that both Household and Infinite Me "showcase immense progressions and immersive sounds" on the split, "building in beautiful ways— and that's a good sign for the future of emo."

Gilbert and Czech also told the Tuned Up podcast that they modified their songwriting process on the split. Whereas Time Spent was written by writing the music and then allowing Gilbert to write and track vocals over it, the split was written by developing the instrumentals and the vocals in tandem. Gilbert and Czech commented that this allowed Gilbert to have a bigger say in the song structures, which resulted in stronger melodies and smoother phrasing throughout. They also commented that how the song functions as a whole and the performance and execution of each part is more important in their new style, whereas the writing more or less shows through and carries the song in punk and hardcore music.

 Joining Equal Vision Records and release of Everything A River Should Be album (February 23, 2018) 

Household announced their signing with Equal Vision Records on December 6, 2017.

On January 15, 2018, Household released a new single, "Don't Listen to Me" with an accompanying video from their new album, Everything A River Should Be.

Household's second album, Everything A River Should Be, was released on February 23, 2018 via Equal Vision. The album was recorded with Nate Washburn at Glow in the Dark studios. Gilbert says the album was two years in writing, and was recorded over a month period. An official press release via Lambgoat states that this album is the first time the band has ever really had production on a recording.

Alt Press defines Household's style on the album as an "earnest, sprawling take on punk-influenced emo sounds." Several review outlets pointed out that Everything A River Should Be marks another change in sound. Hifi Noise wrote that the new album marked a big change for Household as they head into "blending rock and emo for a new sound" that sounds "way more polished" than ever, a feature that suits the band.

An official press release via Lambgoat reports that while "the urgency and sincerity of the raw and visceral post-hardcore they began life making remains, Everything A River Should Be is a collection of dense, dark and brooding songs full of a tense, glowering atmosphere."

On the shift in sound, Gilbert said: "We've been a hardcore band for a while and this is our first transition into more of this rock/emo that we're doing. Writing a record like this felt more true to who I am as an individual but also who our band is."

Gilbert also said: "Household's sound has been changing from the start. Although our change originally had to do with my vocal issues, it is now something that we're all very excited about. I think we all feel that there's a new maturity in what we're finding lately."

Lyrically, Gilbert says that the songs are more personal in nature than previous releases: "The songs touch on some close-to-home feelings for him. It's much more of a personal expression of my own emotions—it's not so much a declarative thing, as some of our music has been in the past."

After recording the record, Household underwent a change in lineup as guitarist Abigail Olson and bassist Josh Czech left the band, with Gilbert moving to vocalist and bassist.

 Label Independence and Recent Releases 
After a tour supporting Senses Fail and Everything A River Should Be, Household went through a quiet period with few updates. In April 2020, the band released the standalone single Spun with an accompanying music video. Spun was included on a 7" split with the song Blur by fellow Minneapolis band Author.

In 2021, the band released a Bandcamp-exclusive compilation album entitled whatamisaying, whatamidoing? The compilation includes songs, demos, acoustic tracks, and snippets of ideas from the preceding years.

On October 6, 2022, Household independently released their fourth full-length album, Hibernate.

 Lyrical themes 

Common lyrical themes include doubt, questioning, finding purpose, growth and maturity, learning faith, embracing the unknown, and learning how to put life into your own terms.

Household has said the message on With or Without is more direct than later releases about what they believe, an approach that Gilbert summarized as: "‘This is what we believe and why.'"

"Sway" is also vulnerable in its asking, "Am I who I thought I'd be now? / So much of what I think constricts so much of who I wanted to be / I wanted to be closer to getting past this than I am." As Blood & Ink summarized, Time Spent's "title and main lyrical themes point to asking the sorts of questions that apply to any young person ... What are we choosing to do with our time, how are we letting our days go by?"

Vocalist Josh Gilbert said this about the themes at play Time Spent: "Time Spent has a lot more to do with searching and asking questions. I know that sounds vague, but we really wanted a record that shows that it's okay to be in a place of wonder and curiosity. It doesn't change anything. It's important, as humans, to seek out curiosity and come to a place of understanding. The album is about finding contentment with asking questions and not necessarily getting the answers you want."

Some reviewers noted a change in lyrical content in Everything A River Should Be toward more personal in nature. Substream reported that the album signals a "more introspective and honest album from Household", as "Gilbert pulled inspiration from within and got more personal on this record than previous releases for the group. You can hear at times on the record where Gilbert is drawing from a deep, personal, and incredibly vulnerable place." Gilbert comments on the personal nature of the lyrics on the newest album, saying: "The songs touch on some close-to-home feelings for me," he says. "It's much more of a personal expression of my own emotions - it's not so much a declarative thing, as some of our music has been in the past. It's more personal and vulnerable in a lot of ways."

 Discography Studio releases'''

 With or Without (EP, September 30, 2014)
 Time Spent (LP, September 25, 2015)
 Split with Infinite Me (EP, May 5, 2017)
 Everything A River Should Be (LP, February 23, 2018)
 Hibernate'' (LP, October 6, 2022)

References 

American punk rock groups
American emo musical groups
Musical groups from the Twin Cities
Musical groups established in 2013
2013 establishments in Minnesota
Equal Vision Records artists